The Midlands Rugby League Division Two is a summer rugby league tournament in the Midlands region of England. It was previously known as the Midlands Rugby League and the Midlands Merit League. Its season runs from April to August.

History

The Midlands Merit League was founded in late 2005 to support the growth of rugby league in non-heartland areas. The 2007 season saw the introduction of an informal under-15 league Midlands Junior League based on Merit League principles. In 2008 the junior competition featured under-14 and under-16 divisions.

The league was renamed RL Merit League (RLML) for the 2008 season due to its increased geographical spread with teams from the North of England taking part. 2009 saw the largest ever entry, with over 30 teams split into two Northern pools; "Yorkshire and Humber" and "North West" and the stand-alone Midlands Rugby League.

In 2012, the Rugby League Conference was replaced by regional leagues and the Midlands Rugby League took control of the RLC Midlands Premier Division and the RLC Midlands regional division. The old Midlands Rugby League continued as Division Two of the new Midlands pyramid.

Community game pyramid

 National Conference League
 Conference League South
 Midlands Rugby League Premier Division
 Midlands Rugby League Division One
 Midlands Rugby League Division Two

Participating clubs

The participating clubs in 2012 were:

Participating teams by season

For information prior to the split see: History of the RL Merit League
2009: Birmingham Bulldogs A, Burntwood Barbarians, Coventry Bears A, Leamington Royals, Leicester Phoenix A, Northampton Casuals A, North Derbyshire Chargers B, Nottingham Outlaws, Redditch Ravens, Telford Raiders A, Wolverhampton Warlords, Wolverhampton Wizards
2010: Birmingham Bulldogs B, Dronfield Drifters, Leicester Storm A, North Derbyshire Chargers, Northampton Casuals A, Nottingham Outlaws B, Telford Raiders A, Wolverhampton RLFC
2011: Coventry Dragons, Coventry Warriors, Dronfield Drifters, Hope Valley Hawks, Leamington Royals A, Leicester Storm A, NEW Ravens, Nottingham Outlaws B, Sleaford Spartans, Telford Raiders A, Wolverhampton RLFC
2012: Bridgnorth Bulls, Coventry Warriors, Derby City, Dronfield Drifters, Hope Valley Hawks, Leamington Royals A, North Derbyshire Chargers, Telford Raiders A
2013: Coventry Dragons A, Coventry Warriors, Derby City, Leamington Royals, Telford Raiders A, Wolverhampton RLFC
2014: Boston Buccaneers, Buxton Bulls, Coventry Bears A, Coventry Dragons A, Derby City A, Sherwood Wolf Hunt

Teams joining the Rugby League Conference

2010: Birmingham Bulldogs A, Coventry Bears A, Leamington Royals, Redditch Ravens
2011: Bristol Sonics A, Northampton Demons A

Format

The scoring system for 2010 for the Midlands Rugby League men's competition was as follows:

Win: 3 points

Draw: 2 points

Defeat not conceded: 1 point

Default on game within three days of fixture: 0 points, with 24-0 score-line awarded to the opposition.

The average number of points scored per game, rather than the total, determines positions in the league table. Teams who have played 6 or more games will be placed higher in the table than those who haven't. If the average is the same, total games played followed by points difference will determine the placings.

Inter-league games between members of the Midlands Rugby League and the London League or RL Merit League can be counted as competitive matches, whilst both leagues are in season. These fixtures will need to be confirmed a week in advance to be guaranteed inclusion as regular season games.

Past winners

For the sake of completeness, previous Midlands competitions are included.

Midlands Merit League Championship

Midlands Merit League Shield

Midlands Rugby League

Midlands Rugby League Division Two

2012 Hope Valley Hawks
2013 Leamington Royals

See also

 British rugby league system
 RL Merit League
 London League (rugby league)
 Rugby League Conference

External links
Midlands rugby league site
Rugby League Conference official site

Rugby League Conference
Sports leagues established in 2009
2009 establishments in England